Šancová Street is a major street in Bratislava's Old Town, extending from the intersection of Štefánikova ulica and Pražská ulica to Trnavské mýto. It is a significant transport artery, and site of frequent traffic congestion.

Origin of the name 
The street is named for the ramparts), which were previously located here, forming part of the customs border for the city. These were finally removed in 1903.

Through history, the route has borne several different names:
1766: Za čiarou, referring to the toll border of the city
1768: Mauth Thor Linie (German)
1769: Linie Graben (German)
1775: Linie (German)
1795: Inner der Schanz (German)
1800: An der Schanze (German)
1807: Linea ad montem Calvariae
1876: Schanzstrasse
1879: Felső Sánc-út (Hungarian)
1880: Schanzgrabenstrasse (German)
1904: Schulpe Györg-Kolonie (German)
1915: Szultán ő felsége (Hungarian), after Ottoman Sultan Mehmed V, ally of the Central Powers in World War I
1921: Šancová ulica (Slovak)
1927: Valy
1945: Malinovského ulica (Slovak), in honor of Soviet military commander Rodion Malinovsky (1898-1967), whose division liberated Bratislava from Nazi Germany
1990: Šancová ulica

Significant buildings 
The YMCA building (formerly YMCA theater and sometimes Dukla), dating to 1921, can be found here.
Nearby stands a building that has been under construction for some years, which was to be 34 floors high upon completion. As of April 2007, only 8 above-ground levels have been completed, and it remains today in this unfinished state.

Nearby streets 
 Karpatská Street
 Jelenia Street
 Pražská Street
 Račianske mýto
 Radlinského Street
 Štefánikova Street
 Trnavské mýto

Notes

References

External links 
Šancová on a map of Bratislava

Streets in Bratislava
Old Town, Bratislava